The 2017 Miami Hurricanes baseball team represented the University of Miami during the 2017 NCAA Division I baseball season. The Hurricanes played their home games at Alex Rodriguez Park at Mark Light Field as a member of the Atlantic Coast Conference. They were led by head coach Jim Morris, in his 24th season at Miami.

The Hurricanes failed to qualify for the NCAA Division I Baseball Championship, ending a 44-year streak of making the postseason tournament.  The streak had been the longest in NCAA history (for any sport, and in any division).

Roster

Coaching staff

Schedule

Rankings

Awards and honors
Jeb Bargfeldt 
All-ACC 2nd Team

References

Miami Hurricanes
Miami Hurricanes baseball seasons
Miami Hurricanes baseball